James A. McClure (1924–2011) was a U.S. Senator from Idaho from 1973 to 1991.

Senator McClure may also refer to:

Alexander McClure (1828–1909), Pennsylvania State Senate
Ian McClure (politician) (1905–1982), Northern Irish Senate
John J. McClure (1886–1965), Pennsylvania State Senate
Mary A. McClure (1939–2016), South Dakota State Senate
Steve McClure (politician) (born 1984), Illinois State Senate